Universal Language is an album by the American jazz saxophonist Joe Lovano recorded in 1992 and released on the Blue Note label.

Reception
The AllMusic review by Stephen Thomas Erlewine stated: "Universal Language is one of Joe Lovano's most ambitious and successful albums, an attempt to prove the cliché that music is indeed the universal language... It's an unabashedly adventurous and risky project, and it works frighteningly well".

Track listing
All compositions by Joe Lovano except as indicated
 "Luna Park" - 5:09 
 "Sculpture" - 9:04 
 "Josie and Rosie" - 6:48 
 "This Is Always" (Harry Warren) - 5:13 
 "Worship" - 4:55 
 "Cleveland Circle" - 4:58 
 "The Dawn of Time" - 7:25 
 "Lost Nations" - 6:23 
 "Hypnosis" - 6:13 
 "Chelsea Rendez-Vous" - 9:14

Personnel
Joe Lovano – tenor saxophone, alto saxophone, wood flute, alto clarinet, drums, percussion
Tim Hagans – trumpet 
Kenny Werner – piano
Charlie Haden, Scott Lee – bass
Steve Swallow - electric bass
Jack DeJohnette – drums
Judi Silvano – vocal

References

External links
 

Joe Lovano albums
1992 albums
Blue Note Records albums